The men's javelin throw at the 2011 European Athletics U23 Championships was held at the Městský stadion on 14 and 16 July. The field included six throwers who had broken the 80 metre line that year. Till Wöschler of Germany, the 2010 World Junior Champion, won with a new personal best of 84.38 metres.

Medalists

Schedule

Results

Qualification
Qualification: Qualification performance 76.00 (Q) or at least 12 best performers advance to the final.

Final

Participation
According to an unofficial count, 23 athletes from 15 countries participated in the event.

References

External links

Javelin M
Javelin throw at the European Athletics U23 Championships